The 2008 Iowa Corn Indy 250 was the eighth round of the 2008 IndyCar Series season. The race was held on June 22, 2008 at the  Iowa Speedway in Newton, Iowa. At the green flag, Hélio Castroneves took the lead in turn 1 from polesitter Scott Dixon. Tony Kanaan quickly moved up to second position. Over the next 10-15 laps, Castroneves and Kanaan battled back-and-forth for the lead, side-by-side on many laps. Kanaan finally muscled the lead away on lap 16, and gained a lead of roughly one second. On lap 39, Ed Carpenter brushed the outside wall in turn 2. The leaders pit, and Kanaan exited the pits as the leader. On lap 51, the green came back out, and a lap later, Castroneves got by Kanaan for the lead. Jaime Camara brought out the yellow on lap 106 when his car lost power and stopped on the course. After another sequence of pit stops, Kanaan led Dan Wheldon and Marco Andretti. On the restart, Wheldon lost control and slid up the track, falling to 8th place.

On lap 157 Mario Moraes spun into the pit apron, bringing out a caution, and the leaders pitted. John Andretti's pitcrew had trouble engaging the fuel hose, and he dropped back the end of the running order. Prior to this he had been running in 7th place, one of the highest positions ever for a Roth Racing car. Castroneves regained the lead on lap 170, and held it until another yellow came out on lap 188 for a spin by Enrique Bernoldi. Most of the leaders pitted, but Wheldon, Hideki Mutoh, and Danica Patrick stayed out to lead the field. On the restart Moraes spun for the second time of the day, and prolonged the yellow until lap 202. On lap 212, Kanaan (running third) suddenly lost control and crashed in turn 1.

On the lap 227 restart, Marco Andretti and Dixon passed Patrick to take third and fourth place respectively. Over the final 15 laps, Mutoh and Marco Andretti battled for second, with Mutoh holding off Andretti's challenge. Wheldon went on to win, and Chip Ganassi Racing donated their race winnings from both cars to Iowa flood relief. After getting by  Patrick late in the race, A. J. Foyt IV finished in the top 5, while John Andretti just missed the top 10, working his way back to 11th.

Result

References

IndyCar Series (Archived 2009-05-21)

Iowa Corn Indy 250
 
Iowa Corn
Iowa Corn Indy 250